Saipa Mehr Karaj Football Club is an Iranian football club based in Karaj, Iran. They currently compete in the 2012–13 Iran Football's 2nd Division. They are an extension of Saipa FC, and are one of the clubs feeder teams.

Season-by-Season

The table below shows the achievements of the club in various competitions.

See also
 2011-12 Hazfi Cup
 2011–12 Iran Football's 2nd Division

https://int.soccerway.com/teams/iran/mehr-karaj-fc/20270/

Football clubs in Iran
Association football clubs established in 2009
2009 establishments in Iran